The 1995 Appalachian State Mountaineers football team was an American football team that represented Appalachian State University as a member of the Southern Conference (SoCon) during the 1995 NCAA Division I-AA football season. In their seventh year under head coach Jerry Moore, the Mountaineers compiled an overall record of 12–1, with a conference mark of 8–0, and finished as SoCon champion.

Schedule

References

Appalachian State
Appalachian State Mountaineers football seasons
Southern Conference football champion seasons
Appalachian State Mountaineers football